The Two-man bobsleigh competition at the 1992 Winter Olympics in Albertville was held on 15 and 16 February, at La Plagne.

Results

References

Bobsleigh at the 1992 Winter Olympics